Zubair Hasan is an Indian economist specialising in Islamic Economics.

He started his teaching career at Meerut College (1957) and retired as Professor Emeritus from INCEIF, The Global University of Islamic Finance Kuala Lumpur, Malaysia (2015).

Hasan  was recipient of the IsDB Prize (Islamic Economics) 2009 the OIC COMCEC AWARD 2014 for  contribution to Islamic economics and Finance. In addition he has been associated with the Maulana Abul Kalam Urdu University, Hyderabad, India, a central government institution of the country as a visiting Professor of Islamic Finance. He has served as Head of Department at Post-graduate Vardhaman College Bijnor (Agra University), Reader-Head at Zakir Hussain Delhi College. He also served as chairman of the Economics Department at the IIUM, Malaysia. Zubair was sent in 1981 on deputation by Government of India to BasraUniversity/Technical Institute, Amarah, Iraq.

On retirement, He donated his collection of materials to the INCEIF Library as a distinct collection, the Zubair Hasan Library. He continues his association as Professor Emeritus of Economics and Finance with INCEIF.

Hasan is the son of the Maulvi Mohammad Majeed Hasan, who established the Madina newspaper (1912-1975).

Selected works

Articles 
 Hasan Zubair (2022): "Population growth dynamics: On fallacious comparisons", International Journal of Humanities and Social Science Research Volume 8, Issue 4, Page No. 129-130
 Hasan, Zubair (2021): Islamic Economics: Morality, Rationality, and Research, JKAU: Islamic Economics, Vol. 34, No. 2 (1 July): pp. 3–13. Jeddah
 Hasan, Zubair (2018): Academic sociology: Alarming rise in predatory publishing and its consequences for Islamic economics and finance, ISRA: International Journal of Islamic Finance Volume 10, Issue, 1, June pp. 8–21.
 Hasan, Zubair (2016) Risk-sharing: the sole basis of Islamic finance? Time for a serious rethink, JKAU Islamic Economics, Jeddah
 Hasan, Zubair (2008): ‘Ensuring Exchange Rate Stability: Is Return to Gold (Dinar) Possible? JKAU: Islamic Economics’ Vol. 21, No. 1 pp3–22

Book Chapters 
 Hasan, Zubair. "Sustainable development from an Islamic perspective: Meaning, implications, and policy concerns." Journal of King Abdulaziz University: Islamic Economics 19, no. 1 (2006).
 Hasan, Zubair. "Islamic banking at the crossroads: theory versus practice." (2005): 11-25.
 Hasan, Zubair. "Measuring efficiency of Islamic banks: criteria, methods, and social priorities." (2004): 1-30.
 Hasan, Zubair. "Islamization of knowledge in economics: Issues and agenda." (1998): 1-40.
Hasan, Z. (2020): ‘Methodology of Islamic Economics – Is the subject worth discussing; in Methodology of Islamic Economics:Problems and solutions, edited by NecmettinKizlkaya: Rutledge UK
Hasan, Z. (2020): Sustainable growth and finance from Islamic perspective in Islamic perspective for sustainable financial system, Mehmet SARAÇ (editor), Istanbul University Press, Turkey· 
Hasan, Z ..(2004): Determinants of FDI Flows to Developing Countries: Case of Malaysia” in‘ Foreign  Direct  Investment  in Developing  Countries’ edited by H.S. Kehal, Palgrave-Macmillan,UK.
Hasan, Z. (1992): ‘Profit Maximization: Secular Versus Islamic’ in SayyidTahir et al (Ed) ‘Readings in Microeconomics: An Islamic Perspective’ Longman, Malaysia 1992 (Chapter 20, PP.239–255).

Books 

 Theory of profit(1975) Vikas, New Delhi (PhD Thesis).
 Foreign Direct Investment flows to Developing countries: Evidence from Malaysia, IIUM, Press 2003, KL
 Microeconomics from Islamic perspective (2006) Pearson, Kuala Lumpur
 Macroeconomics (2009) Oxford University Press, Kuala Lumpur
 Fundamentals of Microeconomics (2011), Oxford University Press, Kuala Lumpur
 Islamic Banking and Finance: An integrative approach (2014) Oxford University Press,Kuala Lumpur
 ECONOMICS with Islamic orientation (2016) Oxford University Press, KualaLumpur
 Theory of profit with Islamic directions (2018) Paragon, USA
 Economic Development from Islamic perspective (2019) LAP, Germany
 Leading issues in Islamic economics & finance: critical evaluations (2020) Palgrave-Macmillan UK.
 Controversial topics in Islamic economics and finance – A reconciliatory approach: Institute of Islamic Economics, 2021, KAU, Sau
  Essays in Islamic Economics and Finance, 2022 AniNik Books, New Delhi
 Islamic Banking and Finance (Second Edition), 2023 Rutledge, UK
 Edited the Urdu Bi-weekly Medina, Bijnor, UP under a pen name  ز- ح for two years 1966-1968 when the editor went on leave.
 Translated into Urdu Gottfried von Haberler: Theory of International Trade (1939) under assignment from the Ministry of Education, Govt. of India

Awards 

 IIUM (International Islamic University Of Malaysia) AWARD - 2003 for excellent researcher in economics.
 IsDB(Islamic Development Bank) PRIZE - 2009 for great contribution to Islamic economics and research.
 OIC Comcec AWARD – 2014 for outstanding contribution to Islamic economics and Finance
 INCEIF( International Centre for Education in Islamic Finance) Professor Emeritus AWARD – 2015 for contribution to Islamic Economics & Finance at the University and worldwide.

References

External links

 Google Scholar Profile
 Ideas Profile

1932 births
Living people
Indian economists
Malaysian economists
Islamic economic jurisprudence